Maria Nardelli (born 9 May 1954 in Taranto) is an Italian paralympic athlete who has won three medals at the Summer Paralympics.

Biography
She is disabled for the effect of polio.

See also
Italy at the 2012 Summer Paralympics

References

External links
 
 Maria Nardelli  at Comitato Italiano Paralimpico 

1954 births
Italian female table tennis players
Table tennis players at the 1992 Summer Paralympics
Table tennis players at the 1996 Summer Paralympics
Table tennis players at the 2000 Summer Paralympics
Table tennis players at the 2004 Summer Paralympics
Table tennis players at the 2008 Summer Paralympics
Table tennis players at the 2012 Summer Paralympics
Paralympic table tennis players of Italy
Medalists at the 1992 Summer Paralympics
Medalists at the 1996 Summer Paralympics
Paralympic medalists in table tennis
Paralympic silver medalists for Italy
Paralympic bronze medalists for Italy
Sportspeople from Taranto
Living people